is a Japanese football player. He is currently contracted to Gamba Osaka in J1 League although he also turns out for their reserve side, Gamba Osaka U-23, in J3 League. He is a goalkeeper.

Club career

Born and raised in Osaka, Hayashi came up through the youth ranks at Gamba Osaka and signed his first professional contract with the club ahead of the 2015 season.   He didn't make any senior appearances through his first 3 seasons with the top team squad and eventually made his J.League debut on 21 April 2018 as a 16th minute substitute for the injured Masaaki Higashiguchi in the Osaka derby match against Cerezo Osaka.   Gamba won the game 1-0 thanks to Hwang Ui-jo's first-half penalty. Owing to Higashiguchi's ongoing injury problems, Hayashi played 7 times in J1 and kept 2 clean sheets.   He also played another 6 games in the cup competitions, 5 in the J.League Cup and once in the Emperor's Cup.

Gamba launched an under-23 side in J3 League in J3 and Hayashi was part of a goalkeeping rotation which saw him play 13 times.   He went on to become first choice 'keeper in 2017 playing 28 out of 32 games in what was a disappointing season that culminated in a 16th-place finish.   2018 was more successful for Gamba Under-23, finishing 6th in the final standings, however, by this time Hayashi was now officially Gamba's J1 team backup goalkeeper and his reserve appearances were limited to just 4 games.

National team career

In October 2013, Hayashi was elected Japan U-17 national team for 2013 U-17 World Cup. He played 1 match against Tunisia.

Club statistics
Last update: 2 December 2018

Reserves performance

References

External links

1996 births
Living people
Association football people from Osaka Prefecture
Japanese footballers
J1 League players
J2 League players
J3 League players
Gamba Osaka players
Gamba Osaka U-23 players
Renofa Yamaguchi FC players
Sportspeople from Osaka
Association football goalkeepers